Schnabl, a German family name, can refer to:

 Johann Andreas Schnabl, Polish-German entomologist
 Johann Nepomuk Schnabl, German schoolteacher and mycologist
 Karl Schnabl, Austrian former ski jumper
 Katja Sturm-Schnabl, Austrian literary scholar, cultural historian, linguist and slavicist
 Siegfried Schnabl, German sexologist

See also
Schnabel (surname)
German-language surnames